Gustavo Rodas (born 16 January 1986 in Rosario, Santa Fe, Argentina) is an Argentine footballer who most recently played for César Vallejo.

Club careers
Rodas started his career in 2002 with Argentina's Primera División club Newell's Old Boys. He made his senior debut in a 4-1 victory against Talleres de Córdoba and scored the fourth goal in the match, which made him the youngest player to score a goal in the Argentina's first division.

Rodas moved to Chinese Super League side Guizhou Renhe in January 2012. He was deemed as the key player of Guizhou by the team manager Gao Hongbo and made his Super League debut on 10 March, in a 2-1 home victory against Shandong Luneng Taishan. However, Rodas and his family could not adapt their lives in Guiyang, and he found it hard to find a Spanish school for his children. On 7 May, Rodas had his Guizhou Renhe contract terminated by mutual consent.

Rodas returned to Peru's Torneo Descentralizado side León de Huánuco in July 2012.

Honours
 Newell's Old Boys
 Argentine Primera División: Apertura 2004
 Deportivo Quito
 Ecuadorian Serie A: 2011
 Argentina U-17
 South American Under-17 Football Championship: 2003

References

External links

1986 births
Living people
Expatriate footballers in Peru
Expatriate footballers in Colombia
Expatriate footballers in Ecuador
Expatriate footballers in China
Argentine expatriate sportspeople in Ecuador
Argentine expatriate sportspeople in Peru
Argentine expatriate sportspeople in Colombia
Argentine expatriate sportspeople in China
Newell's Old Boys footballers
Tiro Federal footballers
El Porvenir footballers
Cúcuta Deportivo footballers
Coronel Bolognesi footballers
León de Huánuco footballers
S.D. Quito footballers
Beijing Renhe F.C. players
Categoría Primera A players
Chinese Super League players
Ecuadorian Serie A players
Peruvian Primera División players
Argentine Primera División players
Argentine footballers
Argentina youth international footballers
Argentine expatriate footballers
Association football midfielders
Footballers from Rosario, Santa Fe